John Danyel or John Daniel (Baptized 6 November 1564 – c. 1626) was an English lute player and songwriter. He was born in Wellow, Somerset, and was the younger brother of poet Samuel Daniel. His surviving works include "Coy Daphne Fled", about the nymph Daphne and her fate, and "Like as the lute delights".

Sample lyrics from "Like as the lute delights":
Like as the lute delights, or else dislikes,
As is his art that plays upon the same;
So sounds my muse, according as she strikes
On my heart strings, high-tuned unto her fame.

Daniel held some offices at court, and was the author of Songs for the Lute, Viol and Voice (1606).

Sources
 Sadie, S. (ed.) (1980) The New Grove Dictionary of Music & Musicians, [vol. # 5].

References

External links

Music Collection in Cambridge Digital Library which contains early copies/examples of Danyel's compositions

English classical musicians
People from Somerset
16th-century English composers
17th-century English composers
1560s births
1620s deaths
English lutenists
English male composers
17th-century male musicians